Amigo is the third studio album by Kendji Girac. It was released on 31 August 2018 with "Maria Maria" released as the debut single from the album. The tracks were mostly written by Girac himself and music composed by Renaud Rebillaud. Vianney contributed in 2 tracks.  Damso, Felipe Saldivia, Fred Savio & Florian Rossi pitched in with various tracks as well. The album peaked the French Albums Chart and was certified 3× platinum in France.

Other singles from the album include "Pour oublier" and "Tiago" both in 2018. The album also has a collaboration with Claudio Capéo in the track "Que Dieu me pardonne".

Track list

Charts

Weekly charts

Year-end charts

Certifications

References

2018 albums
Kendji Girac albums